Gaspar Cassadó's Cello Concerto in D minor was first performed in 1926 by Cassadó and Pablo Casals, to whom the work was dedicated.

This piece, like the Suite for Cello Solo, has folk music elements: Spanish, Oriental, and Impressionistic. Gaspar Cassadó studied composition with Maurice Ravel. Ravelian "carnival music" can be heard in the second theme of the first movement. The second movement is a theme and variations. An attacca leads to a pentatonic Rondo.

Recordings
 Martin Ostertag, cello. With the Baden Baden Orchestra conducted by Werner Stiefel.

References

Cello concertos
Compositions by Gaspar Cassadó
1926 compositions